Charles "Scottie" Duncan, nicknamed "Tall Papa and Trees", is an American former Negro league pitcher who played from 1937 to 1940.

Duncan made his Negro leagues debut in 1937 with the Pittsburgh Crawfords. He went on to play for the Birmingham Black Barons and Atlanta Black Crackers, and finished his career in 1940 with the St. Louis–New Orleans Stars.

References

External links
 and Seamheads

Year of birth missing
Place of birth missing
Atlanta Black Crackers players
Birmingham Black Barons players
St. Louis–New Orleans Stars players
Pittsburgh Crawfords players
Baseball pitchers